Deepika Singh versus Central Administrative Tribunal   (2022) is a landmark decision of the Supreme Court of India that widens the definition of ‘family’ under Indian law.

Background 
Deepika Singh, who worked as a nurse at a government medical institute, Postgraduate Institute of Medical Education and Research (PGIMER) in Chandigarh, was denied her application for maternity leave after she gave birth. The employer stated the reason for denying her maternity leave as her previous maternity leave to care for her husband’s children from a previous marriage. The two children belonged to her husband’s first marriage.

Her request for an allowance under the 2013 Central Civil Service Rules’ provisions for maternity leave was denied by the Central Administrative Tribunal and the Punjab and Haryana High Court.

Judgment 
The Supreme Court held that a woman’s statutory right to take maternity leave cannot be restricted because she previously used child care leave for her non-biological children.

While ruling in the favor of petitioner, Justice Chandrachud and Justice Bopanna noted that the predominant understanding of the concept of a “family” both in the law and in society ignores both, the many circumstances which may lead to a change in one‟s familial structure, and the fact that many families do not conform to this expectation to begin with. Further, the Justices note that such atypical families are deserving of equal protection under law guaranteed in the Article 14 of the Indian Constitution and benefits available under social welfare legislation.

Significance 
The ruling expands the definition of 'family' in Indian law to include unmarried partnerships, queer relationships and single parent families.

See also 

 LGBT rights in India
 Navtej Singh Johar v. Union of India (2018)
 Justice K. S. Puttaswamy (Retd.) vs Union Of India (2017)
 National Legal Services Authority v. Union of India (2014)

References 

Supreme Court of India cases
LGBT rights in India
Indian LGBT rights case law
2022 in India
2022 in LGBT history
Indian family law